The 2011–12 Kuwaiti Crown Prince Cup is a cup competition involving teams from the Kuwaiti Premier League and the Kuwaiti Division One league. The competition has been brought forward to the beginning of the season and has been changed from a single knockout competition to feature a group stage similar to the Kuwait Federation Cup.

The 2011–12 edition is the 19th edition to be held and Al Kuwait Kaifan are the current defending champions.

Group stage

Group 1

Group 2

Semi-finals

1st Legs

2nd Legs

Final

Kuwait Crown Prince Cup
Kuwait Crown Prince Cup, 2011-12
2011–12 in Kuwaiti football